Dicheirotrichus mannerheimii is a species of ground beetle in the family Carabidae. It is found in Europe and Northern Asia (excluding China) and North America.

Subspecies
These four subspecies belong to the species Dicheirotrichus mannerheimii:
 Dicheirotrichus mannerheimii mannerheimi (R.F.Sahlberg, 1844)
 Dicheirotrichus mannerheimii mannerheimii (R. Sahlberg, 1844)
 Dicheirotrichus mannerheimii oreophilus (K. & J.Daniel, 1890)
 Dicheirotrichus mannerheimii ponojensis (J.Sahlberg, 1875)

References

Further reading

 

Harpalinae
Articles created by Qbugbot
Beetles described in 1844